Colenso may refer to:

People 

 Elizabeth Fairburn Colenso, wife of William Colenso
 Frances Colenso (1849–1887), historian, daughter of John William Colenso 
 Harriette Colenso, Anglican missionary, daughter of John William Colenso 
 John Colenso (1814–1883), first Anglican bishop of Natal, mathematician, theologian, Biblical scholar and social activist
 William Colenso (1811–1899), missionary, botanist and politician in New Zealand

Other 

 Battle of Colenso, 1899, during the Second Boer War
 Colenso, KwaZulu-Natal, town in eastern South Africa
 Colenso Power Station
 Colenso Parade, alternative rock band from Belfast, Northern Ireland

Cornish-language surnames